The California Institute of the Arts (CalArts) is a private art university in Santa Clarita, California. It was incorporated in 1961 as the first degree-granting institution of higher learning in the US created specifically for students of both the visual and performing arts. It offers Bachelor of Fine Arts, Master of Fine Arts, Master of Arts, and Doctor of Musical Arts degrees through its six schools: Art, Critical Studies, Dance, Film/Video, Music, and Theater.

The school was first envisioned by many benefactors in the early 1960s, staffed by a diverse array of professionals including Nelbert Chouinard, Walt Disney, Lulu Von Hagen, and Thornton Ladd. CalArts students develop their own work, over which they retain control and copyright, in a workshop atmosphere.

History
CalArts was originally formed in 1961, as a merger of the Chouinard Art Institute (founded 1921) and the Los Angeles Conservatory of Music (founded 1883). Both of the formerly existing institutions were going through financial difficulties, and the founder of the Art Institute, Nelbert Chouinard, was mortally ill. Walt Disney was longtime friends with both Chouinard and Lulu May Von Hagen, the chair of the Conservatory, and discovered and trained many of his studio's artists at the two schools (including Mary Blair, Maurice Noble, and some of the Nine Old Men, among others). To keep the educational mission of the schools alive, the merger and expansion of the two institutions was coordinated; a process which continued after Walt's death in 1966. Joining him in this effort were his brother Roy O. Disney, Nelbert Chouinard, Lulu May Von Hagen and Thornton Ladd (Ladd & Kelsey, Architects).

Without Walt, the remaining founders assembled a team and planned on creating CalArts as a school that was a destination, like Disneyland, to be a feeder school for the various arts industries. To lead this project they appointed Robert W. Corrigan as the first president of the institute.

The original board of trustees at CalArts included Harrison Price, Royal Clark, Robert W. Corrigan, Roy E. Disney, Roy O. Disney, film producer Z. Wayne Griffin, H. R. Haldeman, Ralph Hetzel (then vice president of Motion Picture Association of America), Chuck Jones, Ronald Miller, Millard Sheets, attorney Maynard Toll, attorney Luther Reese Marr, bank executive G. Robert Truex Jr., Jerry Wexler, Meredith Willson, Peter McBean and Scott Newhall (descendants of Henry Newhall); and the wives of Roswell Gilpatric, J. L. Hurschler, and Richard R. Von Hagen.

In 1965, the Alumni Association was founded. The 12 founding board of directors members were Mary Costa, Edith Head, Gale Storm, Marc Davis, Tony Duquette, Harold Grieve, John Hench, Chuck Jones, Henry Mancini, Marty Paich, Nelson Riddle, and Millard Sheets.

The ground-breaking for CalArts' current campus took place on May 3, 1969, as part of the Master Plan for a new planned community in the Santa Clarita Valley of Los Angeles. However, construction of the new campus was hampered by torrential rains, labor shortages, and the Sylmar Earthquake in 1971. CalArts moved to its new campus in Valencia, now part of the city of Santa Clarita, California, in November 1971.

Founding CalArts president Corrigan, formerly the founding dean of the School of Arts at New York University, fired almost all the artists who taught at Chouinard and the Conservatory in his attempt to remake CalArts into his new vision. He appointed fellow academic Herbert Blau to be the founding dean of the School of Theatre and Dance, and serve as the Institute's first Provost. Blau and Corrigan then hired other academics to found the original academic areas, including Mel Powell (dean of the School of Music), Paul Brach (dean of the School of Art), Alexander Mackendrick (dean of the School of Film), Maurice R. Stein (director of Critical Studies), and Richard Farson (dean of the School of Design, the remains of which was integrated into in the Art school as the Graphic Design program), as well as other influential faculty such as Stephan von Huene, Allan Kaprow, Bella Lewitzky, Michael Asher, Jules Engel, John Baldessari, Judy Chicago, Ravi Shankar, Max Kozloff, Miriam Shapiro, Douglas Huebler, Morton Subotnick, Norman M. Klein, and Nam June Paik, most of whom came from a counterculture and avant garde perspective.

Corrigan held his position until 1972, when he was fired and replaced by then board member William S. Lund, Walt Disney's son-in-law, as the Institute approached insolvency. The period between 1972 and 1975 was extremely unstable financially, and Lund had to make significant operational reductions, including layoffs, to keep the Institute alive.

In 1975, Robert J. Fitzpatrick was appointed president of CalArts. During his presidency, the Institute grew its enrollment and stabilized, and added new programs for which it is known globally today, including the programs in Character Animation and Jazz. While President, Fitzpatrick also served as the director of the 1984 Olympic Arts Festival. He then founded the Los Angeles Festival, which grew directly out of the proceeds of the 1984 Olympic Games. After 1984, John Orders (the assistant to the president/chief of staff) largely coordinated the Institute's operations in partnership with the other leaders. In 1987, Fitzpatrick resigned as president to take the position of head of EuroDisney (now Disneyland Paris) in Paris, France.

In 1988, Steven D. Lavine, then the Assistant Program Director for the Arts and Humanities of the Rockefeller Foundation, was appointed president. During his time in office, Lavine continued to grow enrollment without physically expanding the campus, and added the Roy & Edna Disney CalArts Theatre, part of the Los Angeles Music Center’s new Walt Disney Concert Hall project, to the operations of the Institute.

Lavine navigated the 1994 Northridge Earthquake which closed the main building in Valencia at the start of the spring semester. Classes were held in rental party tents on the 60 acre grounds, and alternate teaching locations were scattered miles apart around Los Angeles County. The building was “red tagged” and not allowed to be used until millions of dollars of repairs were performed. The Federal Emergency Management Agency provided the bulk of the financial assistance allowing fundamental repairs due to seismic activity to occur, with private donations allowing the renovations of certain spaces in the building, which opened during the fall semester.

Also in 1994, Herb Alpert, a professional musician and admirer of the institute, established the Alpert Awards in the Arts in collaboration with CalArts and his Herb Alpert Foundation. The foundation provides the funding for the awards and related activity. The Institute's faculty in the fields film/new media, visual arts, theatre, dance, and music select artists in their field to nominate an individual artist who is recognized for their innovation in their given medium. Recipients of the award have a visiting artist residency at CalArts, mentor students, and sometimes premiere work. In 2008, CalArts named the School of Music for Alpert, in recognition of his ongoing support.

On August 29, 2014, a freshman student identified as Regina filed a Title IX process complaint with the U.S. Department of Education's Office of Civil Rights against CalArts, alleging an improper response to her reported rape by a classmate. According to Aljazeera, the CalArts administration's process included the questioning of the victim, "...ask[ing] her questions about her drinking habits, how often she partied, the length of her dress, ..." The victim alleged that she was also subjected to retaliation from friends of the perpetrator. The perpetrator was ultimately found responsible by the Institute's investigation process and was suspended. The student's process complaint was investigated and dismissed by the Department of Education's Office of Civil Rights. During the process of the complainant's Title IX investigation, CalArts students walked out of their classes and protested in solidarity with the victim, later initiating a student-led meeting to discuss the issue of sexual assault.

On June 24, 2015, Lavine announced he would step down as president in May 2017, after 29 years in the position.

On December 13, 2016, after an 18-month search which included over 500 candidates, Chair Tim Disney and the CalArts board of trustees announced that Ravi S. Rajan, then the dean of the School of the Arts at the State University of New York at Purchase, was unanimously selected as president, to begin in June 2017.

Over the years the institute has developed experimental interdisciplinary laboratories such as the Center for Experiments in Art, Information, and Technology, Center for Integrated Media, Center for New Performance at CalArts, and the Cotsen Center for Puppetry and the Arts. Some of these experimental labs continue today.

Academics
CalArts offers various undergraduate and graduate degrees in programs that are related to and combine music, art, dance, film, animation, theater, and writing.  Students receive intensive professional training in an area of their creative aspirations without being cast into a rigid pattern. The Institute's overall focus is on experimental, multidisciplinary, contemporary arts practices, and its stated mission is to enable the professional artists of tomorrow, artists who will transform the world through artistic practice.  With these goals in place, the Institute encourages students to recognize the complexity of political, social, and aesthetic questions and to respond to them with informed, independent judgment.

Admission
Every program within the Institute requires that applicants send in an artist's statement, along with a portfolio or audition to be considered for admission. The institute has never required an applicant's SAT or other test scores, and does not consider an applicant's GPA as part of the admission process without the consent of the applicant .

Conception and foundation
The initial concept behind CalArts' interdisciplinary approach came from Richard Wagner's idea of Gesamtkunstwerk ("total artwork"), of which Walt Disney himself was fond and explored in a variety of forms, beginning with his own studio, then later in the incorporation of CalArts. He began with the film Fantasia (1940), where animators, dancers, composers, and artists alike collaborated. In 1952, Walt Disney Imagineering was founded, where Disney formed a team of artists including Herbert Ryman, Ken O’Brien, Collin Campbell, Marc Davis, Al Bertino, Wathel Rogers, Mary Blair, T. Hee, Blaine Gibson, Xavier Atencio, Claude Coats, and Yale Gracey. He believed that the same concept that developed WDI could also be applied to a university setting, where art students of different media would be exposed to and explore a wide range of creative directions.

Schools
Schools at CalArts include:

 School of Art
 School of Critical Studies
 School of Film/Video
 The Herb Alpert School of Music
 School of Theater
 The Sharon Disney Lund School of Dance

Notable facilities

A113

A113 is a classroom at CalArts where the character animation program (then called the Disney animation program) was originally founded. Many CalArts alumni have inserted references to it in their works (not just animation) as an homage to this classroom and to CalArts.

Downtown Los Angeles

In 2003, CalArts built a theater and art gallery in downtown Los Angeles called REDCAT, the Roy and Edna Disney CalArts Theater as part of the Walt Disney Concert Hall in the Los Angeles Music Center.

John Baldessari Art Studios
In 2013, CalArts opened its John Baldessari Art Studios, which cost $3.1 million to build, and features approximately 7,000 square feet of space for MFA Art students and program courses. In addition to debt, funding for the studios was partially raised by the sale of artwork donated by School of Art alumni, for whom each studio was then named.

Notable alumni, faculty, and honorary degrees
List of California Institute of the Arts people

Alpert Award in the Arts
The Alpert Award in the Arts was established in 1994 by The Herb Alpert Foundation and CalArts. The Institute annually awards a $75,000 no-strings-attached fellowship to five artists in the fields of dance, film and video, music, theatre, and visual arts. Awardees have a residency at CalArts during the following academic year.

Critical reception and cultural influence

In 2011, Newsweek/The Daily Beast listed CalArts as the top school for arts-minded students. The ranking was not aimed to assess the country's best school, but rather to assess campuses that offer an exceptional artistic atmosphere.

CalArts’ various schools are consistently featured in the top ten lists of the “best schools” of Art, Film, Animation, Theater, Music, and Dance of publications such as U.S. News, New York Times, The Hollywood Reporter, Variety, and various other news and trade publications. No other single college or university in the world reflects such a high reputation across the full breadth of the many arts and creative industries.

Animation industry
Several students who attended CalArts' animation programs in the 1970s eventually found work at Walt Disney Animation Studios, and several of those went on to successful careers at Disney, Pixar, and other animation studios.  In February 2014, Vanity Fair magazine highlighted the success of CalArts' 1970s animation alumni and briefly profiled several (including Jerry Rees, John Lasseter, Tim Burton, John Musker, Brad Bird, Gary Trousdale, Kirk Wise, Henry Selick and Nancy Beiman) in an article illustrated with a group portrait taken by photographer Annie Leibovitz inside classroom A113.

In the late 1980s, a group of CalArts animation students contacted animation director Ralph Bakshi. As he was in the process of moving to New York, they persuaded him to stay in Los Angeles to continue to produce adult animation. Bakshi then got the production rights to the cartoon character Mighty Mouse. By Bakshi's request, Tom Minton and John Kricfalusi then went to the CalArts campus to recruit the best talent from what was the recent group of graduates. They hired Jeff Pidgeon, Rich Moore, Carole Holiday, Andrew Stanton and Nate Kanfer to work on the then-new Mighty Mouse: The New Adventures television series.

In an interview, Craig "Spike" Decker of Spike and Mike's Festival of Animation commented on the work of independent animator Don Hertzfeldt stating that Hertzfeldt demonstrated good instincts coupled with his lack of interest in the world of commerce. In making a comparison, Decker made a reference to CalArts stating: "A lot of animators come out of CalArts – they could be so prolific, but then they're owned by Disney or someone, and they're painting the fins on the Little Mermaid. You'll never see their full potential".

CalArts style

A pejorative term, "CalArts style", gained prominence in the late 2010s to describe a thin-line animation style that spread around the world during this period. The term's origin is attributed to animator John Kricfalusi in a now-deleted blog post from 2010 about the film The Iron Giant, in which Kricfalusi criticizes what he sees as young animators subconsciously copying superficial aspects of well-respected animators' work without learning underlying animation skills. The so-called "CalArts style" has been attributed to successful animated shows like Adventure Time, Gravity Falls, and Over the Garden Wall, which are from CalArts graduates Pendleton Ward, Alex Hirsch, and Pat McHale, respectively, but has also been attributed to non-CalArts animators, such as Rebecca Sugar's Steven Universe, Kyle Carrozza's Mighty Magiswords, and John McIntyre's 2016 Ben 10 reboot.

Detractors claim that because of CalArts' importance to Western animation, it is the cause of the style of illustration in the animation industry. Animators like Rob Renzetti have questioned the use of the term, saying that it has been applied so broadly as to be functionally meaningless as criticism, and is instead just name calling. Adam Muto, executive producer on Adventure Time, has also said the term over-simplifies the process of animation design, and is too vague. Gavia Baker-Whitelaw on The Daily Dot wrote that many animation fans that deride the "CalArts style" do so only when it is associated with shows that appear to promote, in their views, "Tumblr culture" that favors progressive views.

Art
During the formative years of the Art School many of the teaching artists led different camps of movements. The two main camps were the conceptualism students, which were led by John Baldasseri, and the fluxus camp, which was led by Allan Kaprow. Kaprow's approach to art was a continuation from his tenure at Rugers University. Other movements included Light and Space, which was closely related to the artists associated with the Ferus Gallery in the greater Los Angeles area. In 1972, Calarts hosted an exhibition called The Last Plastics Show, which was organized by faculty artist Judy Chicago, Doug Edge, as well as Dewain Valentine. This exhibition included artists such as, Carole Caroompas, Ron Cooper, Ronald Davis, Fred Eversley, Craig Kauffman, Linda Levi, Ed Moses, Barbara T. Smith, and Vasa Mihich.

In the autobiography Bad Boy: My Life On and Off the Canvas by CalArts alum Eric Fischl, he describes his experience as a student as "CalArts had such a narrow idea of the New. It was innovation for its own sake, a future that didn't include the past But without foundation, without techniques or a deeper understanding of history, you'd go off these wild explorations and end up reinventing the wheel. And then you'd get slammed for it."

Art critic Dave Hickey critiqued the art program of CalArts by suggesting that the variety of reference that students are exposed to is limited to a certain pantheon. He stated "I can go over to Cal Arts and ask them if they know who John Wesly is, and they would go, 'Huh? What discourse does he participate in?' I am in the art world only insofar as there are interesting things for me to write about. When that stops, or when I stop getting offers to write things, I’ll be out." Additionally, Hickey mentioned the use of appropriation by students at programs like CalArts. In this, he referenced the show Pop-Up Video, by which he stated "Creators Tad Low and Woody Thompson should receive honorary MFAs for [Pop Up Video], because grad students worldwide are getting diplomas for just this sort of thing -- stealing (or as they say in art school, "appropriating") hackneyed pop images and scribbling on top of them à la granddaddy Marcel. The show, which would not be out of place on a monitor in a darkened gallery at CalArts [...]".

In the LA Weekly op-ed piece "The Kids Aren't All Right: Is over-education killing young artists?", published in 2005, curator Aaron Rose wrote about an observed trend he recognized in Los Angeles's most esteemed art schools and their MFA programs, including CalArts. He uses the example of Supersonic, "a large exhibition ... that features the work of MFA students from esteemed area programs like CalArts, Art Center, UCLA, etc." In his observation of the showcase, he examined, "... the work left me mostly empty and with a few exceptions seemed like nothing more than a rehash of conceptual ideas that were mined years ago." He went on to state that "these institutions are staffed with amazing talents (Mike Kelley and John Baldessari among them). Legions of creative young people flock to our city [Los Angeles] every year to work alongside their heroes and develop their talents with hopes of making it as an artist." He goes on to further state "What happens too often in these situations, though, is that we find young artists simply emulating their instructors, rather than finding and honing their own aesthetics and points of view about the world, society, themselves. In the beginnings of an artist's career, the power in his or her work should lie not in their technique or knowledge of art history or theory or business acumen, but in what one has to say."

CalArts alumnus Ariel Pink notes in an interview "Unlike other art schools, they didn't focus on skills of any kind, specific color theory or anything like that. They were the only art school that was totally focused on teaching artists about the art market. They were trying to make the next Damien Hirst. They're trying to make the next Jeff Koons. Those guys don't need to know how to paint or draw."

Music
CalArts graduates have joined or started successful pop bands, including: Maryama, Tranquility Bass, The Belle Brigade, The Weirdos, The Swords of Fatima / Buko Pan Guerra, Bedroom Walls, Beelzabubba, Dawn of Midi, Dirtwire, The Rippingtons, Fitz and the Tantrums, Fol Chen, London After Midnight, No Doubt, Mission of Burma, Radio Vago, Oingo Boingo, Acetone, Liars, Suburban Lawns, The Mae Shi,The Suburbs, Touché Amoré, and Ozomatli.

Individually, Danny Elfman and Grant-Lee Phillips never officially enrolled at CalArts, but participated in the world music courses at CalArts. Elfman would later gain recognition for his composition work with CalArts alum Tim Burton, and Phillips would go onto a career in music.

Thurston Moore and Kim Gordon, members of the band Sonic Youth, remarked in an interview with VH1 about the band Liars, of which Angus Andrew and Julian Gross are CalArts luminaries. Moore's initial remarks were: "There's this whole world of young people who [think] everything's allowed. What Liars are doing right now is completely crazy. I saw them the other night and it was really great. It's really out-there". Gordon then stated "I'm not so crazy about the way [the Liars' They Were Wrong, So We Drowned] sounds. It's like 'how lo-fi can we make it?' But I think the content is really good". In reference to CalArts and Gordon's statement, Moore lastly remarked "They're art kids. They came out of CalArts and that's the kind of sensibility you have when you come out of these sort of places." Interestingly, Moore's partner Gordon went to the Otis College of Art and Design, herself a product of an art school.In a 2005 interview, Moore discussed the book Jack Goldstein and the CalArts Mafia and his conversation with Gordon after reading the book. During their conversation, Moore asked Gordon why she had chosen to attend Otis College of Art and Design instead of CalArts, a school she had always wanted to attend since she grew up in Los Angeles. Gordon explained that she was unable to afford CalArts' high tuition. Moore went on to emphasize that the book did not mention the economic feasibility of attending CalArts and that this financial barrier can create a division between those who can afford highly-regarded academic art education and those who pursue DIY art.

See also
Afterall
Black Clock
East of Borneo
Pixar
The 1 Second Film
The Pictures Generation
Womanhouse

References

External links

 

 
Universities and colleges in Los Angeles County, California
Art schools in California
Drama schools in the United States
Film schools in California
Music schools in California
Creative writing programs
Performing arts education in the United States
Private universities and colleges in California
Education in Santa Clarita, California
Schools accredited by the Western Association of Schools and Colleges
Educational institutions established in 1961
1961 establishments in California
Theatres in California
Event venues established in 1993
School buildings completed in 1971
Santa Clarita, California
Art in Greater Los Angeles
Performing arts in California
Animation schools in the United States